Gibberula aperta is a species of very small sea snail, a marine gastropod mollusc or micromollusc in the family Cystiscidae.

Description
The length of the shell attains 1.58 mm.

Distribution
This marine species occurs in the Antilles off Curaçao.

References

External links

Cystiscidae
Gastropods described in 2008